The Tableland was a Legislative Assembly electorate in the state of Queensland, Australia.

History
The Tableland was created in the 1931 redistribution, taking effect at the 1932 state election. It was based in the Atherton Tableland, west of Cairns.

The Tableland was abolished at the 1950 state election, the eastern portion forming the newly recreated district of Mulgrave and the remainder forming part of the enlarged new Electoral district of Tablelands.

Members

The following people were elected in the seat of The Tableland:

See also
 Electoral districts of Queensland
 Members of the Queensland Legislative Assembly by year
 :Category:Members of the Queensland Legislative Assembly by name

References

Former electoral districts of Queensland
1932 establishments in Australia
1950 disestablishments in Australia
Constituencies established in 1932
Constituencies disestablished in 1950